This Is Our Art is the debut studio album by the Scottish band the Soup Dragons, released in 1988.

The album peaked at No. 60 on the UK Albums Chart.

Critical reception

Trouser Press wrote that the album demonstrates "an amazing range, yet there’s something insincere about these songs, which seemingly don’t know when to end." The Washington Post stated that it displays "a deft, if overreaching, eclecticism." 

The Toronto Star deemed This Is Our Art "spikey guitar pop." The Omaha World-Herald called it "catchier and more melodic" than the band's debut.

AllMusic noted that "the Soup Dragons are far more effective when they're gorging themselves on bubblegum like the sweet jangle pop of 'Soft As Your Face' and 'Turning Stone'." The Rolling Stone Album Guide panned the "astonishingly pointless stylistic range."

Track listing

Personnel
The Soup Dragons
Sean Dickson - vocals, guitar
Jim McCulloch - guitar, backing vocals
Sushil K. Dade - bass
Ross Sinclair - drums
with:
Dean Klavett, Kevin Malpass - keyboards

References

The Soup Dragons albums
1988 albums
Sire Records albums